Shen Yunyun (born August 24, 1991) is a Chinese male acrobatic gymnast. Along with his partner, Wu Wenhui, he finished 5th in the 2014 Acrobatic Gymnastics World Championships.

References

1991 births
Living people
Chinese acrobatic gymnasts
Male acrobatic gymnasts